Sargon Gabriel is a famous Assyrian musician born in Baghdad, Iraq.

1970s

Yimma Yimma (1973)

Atouraya (1976)

Nineveh (1978)

1980s

Shlama Athuraya (1980)
Producer: Sargon N. Yonan
Music Arranged and Played by: Heart Beat Band
Musicians:
Joseph Yackob: Drums and Bangos
Ashoor Baba: Lead, Rhythm Guitar and Bazouki
Shlimon Khamo: Bass Guitar
Andy Taroyan: Keyboard

Dalaleh (1981)

Ganta D'Perdeisa (1982)
Music Arranged and Played by: Duklit Band
Musicians:
William Nissan: Lead Guitar
Allen George: Bass Guitar
Joseph : Keyboards
Edward Sliwo: Drums
Johnson Babella: Saxophone
Freddy DeEil: Lead Guitar

Khooyada D'Omta (1983)
Music Arranged by: Tiglat Issabey
Produced by: Sargon Yonan
Engineered by: Fred Britberd
Assisted by: Robert Noghli and Paul
Musicians:
Tiglat Issabey: Piano
William Nissan: Guitar
Allan George: Bass
Edward Sliwo: Drums
Alaiho: Percussion
Lloyd King: Flute
Wayne Wisniewski: Trumpet
John Demos: French Horn
Sargon Yonan: Oud, Synthesizer, Qanoon
Erni & Assembly: Strings

Parzona (1984)
Arranged by: Robert Noghli & Ashoor Baba
Engineered by: Glen Odagawa
Mixed by: Glen Odagawa and Robert Noghli
Musicians:
Robert Noghli : Drums, Percussions, Simmons Drums
Ashoor Baba : Guitars, Orchestron and Synthesizer
Tony Brown and Brian Surina : Bass
Chris Cameron : Memory Moog and Yamaha DX7
Kraig McCreary : Acoustic and Electric Guitars
Jim Stynoff : Clarinet
Steve Eisen : Flute and Soprano Sax

Sara (1985)

Way Way Minnakh (1987)

Neqda (1989)

1990s

Lishana d'Yimma (1991)

Kertey (1992)
Music arranged by: Eshaya Nano
Album cover by: Edward Gabriel
Recorded & produced by:Eshaya Nano in Sydney, Australia
Musicians:
Romeo Nano: Piano
Moneer Benjamin: Bass Guitar
Danny Nano: Drums & Percussion
Johnny Brikho: Solo Synthesizer
Eshaya Nano: Keyboards & Guitar

Nineveh (1994)
Recorded & produced by:Eshaya Nano in Sydney, Australia
Musicians:
Eshaya Nano: Keyboards & Guitar
Ben Al Bazi (Fudi): Solo Keyboards
Danny Nano: Drums & Percussion
Linkin Gewargis: Bass
Romeo Nano: Piano

Shooshla (1996)
Music arranged by: Noel Mando (except "Rawaya" and "Erzala")
Music played and programmed by: William Nissan
Music tracked and mixed by: Eshaya Nano at Studio 46 in Sydney, Australia
Musicians:
William Nisan: Rhythm section and backgrounds
Phillip Khammou:Lead Synthesizer
Rasson Bet Younan: Piano

Darwid (1997)
Music arranged & programmed by: William Nissan
Music mixed by: William Nissan and Melis Eshay
Leads Synth by: Odi Khoury
Percussion by: Amer H.
Background Vocals : Ramsen Sheeno
"Darwid" arranged and played by: Gilbert Hanna & Phillip Khamo

The Best of Sargon Gabriel (1998)
Compilation of Sargon Gabriel's greatest hits

2000s

The Legend Continues (2002)
Music arranged & programmed by: Samir Daniel
Recorded and mixed at PLD Studio
Cover design by: Freddy Gabriel
Musicians:
Samir Daniel: Guitar, Keyboard, Percussion
Ashur Silwo: Drums
James Mirza: Drums
Moneer Benjamen: Bass
Nabeel Khamo: Piano & Additional Keyboards
Joseph Youkhana: Additional Keyboards

Perdaisa (2004)
Music on Tracks 1, 4, 5, 6, 7 arranged by: William Nissan (USA)
Music on Tracks 2 & 3 arranged by: Samir Daniel (Australia)
Tracks 1,4,5,6 recorded by Bassim Zahdan at BZ Studios
Track 7 recorded  by: Melis Eshaya at MS Studios
Tracks 2,3 recorded by: Samir Daniel
Musicians:
Murad Taiym: Keyboards
Douglas Issac: Bass Guitar
Rami & Liz: Violins

Live In Sydney (2004)
2 Disc set of live performance in Sydney, Australia

Disc 1:

Disc 2:

Al Balee (2006)
Arranged by: Ramiel Band
Produced by: Francis Bijou
Recorded and Mixed at Ashur Esho Recording Studio in Chicago, IL
Musicians:
Joseph Youkhanna: Guitars
Francis Bijou: Bass
George Awraha: Keyboards
Robert Youmaran: Drums & Percussion
Guest Musicians:
Laith Yousif: Oud
Rami Yosif: Violin & Viola
Kostas Sotiroupolos: Bouzouki
Firas Hermis: Latin Perc
Robert Artinian: Clarinet
Edward Hanna: Tabla
Sebo: Ethnic Drums
Ashiq: Zurna
Naiyif: Nay
Kinan: Cello
Background Vocals
Joan Dawoud
Ramsin Sheeno
Joseph Youkhanna
John Mirza
Francis Bijou

2010s

Bassy Bassy (2010)
Music arranged by: Ramiel Band
Tracks 6 & 8 arranged by: Wael Keyboard
Recorded & Mixed by: Ashur Isho
Tracks 1,2,5,6,8,9 recorded by: Rennie Daniel, Australia
Musicians:
Ramsin Youkhana: Keyboards
Ashur Isho: Acoustic Guitar
Rami Yousif: Violin
Francis Bijou: Bass
Edmon Louis: Percussion

Shoryen Zmara (2012)
All music played and arranged by: Nono Barkho
Mixing and mastering by: Dani Shomoon at Dan Studios in Toronto, Canada

References
queenatha.com

Folk music discographies
Discographies of Iraqi artists